is the first compilation album by Japanese band Wagakki Band. It was released on November 29, 2017 by Avex Trax in five editions: CD only, two music video editions, and two live concert editions with two DVDs or one Blu-ray disc. The live concert editions feature the Wagakki Band Hall Tour 2017: Shiki no Irodori show. In addition, a mu-mo Shop exclusive box set was released, featuring both music video and concert DVDs and Blu-ray discs, and a bonus two-disc DVD of the Wagakki Band Heian Jingū Tandoku Hōnō Live in Wagakki Summit 2017 show. The album compiles the band's popular songs from their first three albums and includes five new songs.

The album peaked at No. 3 on Oricon's albums chart and was certified Gold by the RIAJ.

Track listing
All tracks are arranged by Wagakki Band.

Personnel 
 Yuko Suzuhana – vocals
 Machiya – guitar
 Beni Ninagawa – tsugaru shamisen
 Kiyoshi Ibukuro – koto
 Asa – bass
 Daisuke Kaminaga – shakuhachi
 Wasabi – drums
 Kurona – wadaiko

Charts

Certification

References

External links 
 
  (Avex Group)
 
 

Wagakki Band compilation albums
2017 compilation albums
Japanese-language compilation albums
Avex Group compilation albums